Cidade Universitária is a train station on ViaMobilidade Line 9-Emerald, in the district of Alto de Pinheiros in São Paulo.

History
The station was built by Fepasa to attend University of São Paulo students, being opened on 4 April 1981. In 1996, CPTM starts operating the Fepasa commuter train lines, including this station. It was reformed and reopened on 28 March 2010. Between 28 August 2000 and 9 September 2011, it was connected with São Paulo Metro station Vila Madalena through the Orca Shuttle Service.

References

Railway stations opened in 1981
1981 establishments in Brazil